Kyle Peko (born July 23, 1993) is an American football defensive tackle for the Las Vegas Raiders of the National Football League (NFL). He played college football at Cerritos College and Oregon State.

Professional career

Denver Broncos
On May 3, 2016, Peko signed with the Denver Broncos as an undrafted rookie free agent following the 2016 NFL Draft. On September 20, he was released by the Broncos and was re-signed to the practice squad on September 22. He was promoted to the active roster on December 28.

During the 2017 season, Peko was involved in multiple transactions and he was signed and released five times.

On September 1, 2018, Peko was waived by the Broncos and was signed to the practice squad the next day. He was released on September 11, 2018.

Buffalo Bills
On September 12, 2018, Peko was signed to the Buffalo Bills' practice squad. He signed a reserve/future contract with the Bills on December 31, 2018.

On August 31, 2019, Peko was waived by the Bills and was signed to the practice squad the next day. He was promoted to the active roster on September 24, 2019. He was waived on November 2.

Indianapolis Colts
On November 4, 2019, Peko was claimed off waivers by the Indianapolis Colts, but was waived five days later and re-signed to the practice squad.

Denver Broncos (second stint)
On December 14, 2019, Peko was signed by the Denver Broncos off the Colts practice squad. On July 28, 2020, Peko announced he was opting out of the 2020 season due to the COVID-19 pandemic. He was released after the season on February 18, 2021.

Tennessee Titans
On July 26, 2021, Peko signed with the Tennessee Titans. He was placed on injured reserve on August 26, 2021. He was released on September 6. He was re-signed to the practice squad on October 13. He was promoted to the active roster on November 17.

Las Vegas Raiders
On March 22, 2022, Peko signed with the Las Vegas Raiders. He was released on August 30, 2022. He was re-signed to the practice squad on September 5, 2022. On September 13, 2022, Peko was released from the practice squad and then re-signed on October 26, 2022. On December 6, 2022, Peko signed for the Raiders' active roster.

Personal life

In 2019 Peko's wife, Giuliana, was diagnosed with cancer, specifically stage 3 Hodgkin's lymphoma, and Kyle was excused for the first day of Bills training camp. Peko later announced that her treatment was successful and she was cancer free. Peko and Giuliana have two children together.

References

External links 
 Denver Broncos bio
 Oregon State Beavers bio

1993 births
Living people
American sportspeople of Samoan descent
Sportspeople from Orange County, California
People from La Habra, California
Players of American football from California
American football defensive tackles
Oregon State Beavers football players
Denver Broncos players
Buffalo Bills players
Indianapolis Colts players
Tennessee Titans players
Las Vegas Raiders players
Ed Block Courage Award recipients